Krombach is a community in the Aschaffenburg district in the Regierungsbezirk of Lower Franconia (Unterfranken) in Bavaria, Germany and a member of the Verwaltungsgemeinschaft (Administrative Community) of Schöllkrippen.

Geography

Location

The community lies in the Bavarian Lower Main (Bayerischer Untermain). It has only one Gemarkung (traditional rural cadastral area), also called Krombach.

History
The hegemony of the Counts of Schönborn was mediatized in 1806 at the behest of the Principality of Aschaffenburg, with which it passed in 1814 (by this time it had become a department of the Grand Duchy of Frankfurt) to Bavaria. In the course of administrative reform in Bavaria, the current community came into being with the Gemeindeedikt (“Municipal Edict”) of 1818. The hereditary court at Krombach was abolished in 1849.

Population development
Within municipal limits, 1,501 inhabitants were counted in 1970, 1,772 in 1987, and 2,178 in 2000.

Politics

Community council

The council is made up of 15 council members, counting the part-time mayor.

(as at municipal election held on 3 March 2002)

Mayors
The mayor is Peter Seitz, elected in 2014 and re-elected in 2020.

Coat of arms
The community’s arms might be described thus: Gules a lion passant Or with a tail forked crowned azure, the base dancetty of three argent, the lion’s gambes on the points of the partition, the chief barry of four of the first and second.

The official German blazon reads: .

Armorial history
The community of Krombach was for the most part under the ownership of the Counts of Rieneck, and it was the seat of a court. The Counts died out in 1559 and the community’s ownership passed to the Archbishopric of Mainz. In 1666, the court was acquired by the family of the Barons – later Counts – of Schönborn. The community became the hub of the Counts’ holdings in the upper Kahl valley. The lion, drawn from the Counts’ arms, recalls the time when they held sway. The barry (that is, horizontally striped) chief was taken from the arms borne by the earlier lords, the Counts of Rieneck. The tinctures gules and argent (red and silver) stem from the arms borne by Electoral Mainz, to which the community also once belonged.

The community has borne the arms since 8 June 1967.

Education
In 1999, the following institutions were to be found in the community:
Kindergartens: 75 places with 88 children

References

Aschaffenburg (district)